Ladies and gentlemen is a salutation used in the field of entertainment, sports and theater since the mid-19th century vaudeville era. It is intended to raise the audience's expectations of a good performance and, to this end, is often followed by an announcement of the names of the performers, a description of what sort of act they are to perform, or an often hyperbolic series of accolades accorded to the act.

The motivation behind the term is to make the audience feel as if they have paid a substantial amount for the privilege of witnessing the event in question, and thus raise their expectations for what is to come.

19th-century introductions
Greeting words and phrases
Vaudeville tropes